

Documentaries

Shorts

References

External links 
IMDB listing for German films made in 1934
filmportal.de listing for films made in 1934

German
Lists of German films
film